This list is of the Natural Monuments of Japan within the Prefecture of Kagoshima.

National Natural Monuments
As of 1 April 2021, forty-eight Natural Monuments have been designated, including seven *Special Natural Monuments.

Prefectural Natural Monuments
As of 1 June 2020, forty-eight Natural Monuments have been designated at a prefectural level.

Municipal Natural Monuments
As of 1 May 2020, one hundred and seventy-nine Natural Monuments have been designated at a municipal level.

See also
 Cultural Properties of Japan
 Parks and gardens in Kagoshima Prefecture
 List of Places of Scenic Beauty of Japan (Kagoshima)
 List of Historic Sites of Japan (Kagoshima)

References

External links
  Cultural Properties in Kagoshima Prefecture

 Kagoshima
Kagoshima Prefecture